Grace Fredrica Edwards (January 3, 1933 – February 25, 2020) was an American author who served as a director of the Harlem Writers Guild.

In February 2020, she died at the age of 87.

Biography 
Grace was born as Grace Fredrica Smith on January 3, 1933, in Harlem Hospital, New York to William Smith, a laborer for the depression-era works progress administration, and Fredrica Smith, a homemaker. She was educated at the City University of New York.

Grace also served as a professor of creative writing at the College of New Rochelle, Hofstra University, Hunter College, and Marymount Manhattan College.

She also worked as a contributor for The Los Angeles Times Book Review and The Washington Post Book Review.

Awards
In 1999, she received the Fiction Honor Book award from the Black Caucus of the American Literary Association.

Bibliography 
 In the Shadow of the Peacock (1988)
 If I Should Die (1997)
 No Time to Die (1998)
 A Toast Before Dying (1998)
 Do or Die (2000)
 The Viaduct'' (2004)

References 

1933 births
2020 deaths
20th-century African-American women writers
20th-century African-American writers
20th-century American women writers
21st-century African-American women writers
21st-century African-American writers
21st-century American women writers
American mystery novelists
American women writers
City University of New York alumni